This is a list of heritage sites on the State Register of Heritage Places within the Shire of York in Western Australia but not within the York town site.

References

Shire of York
York